Tephritis conura is a species of fly in the family Tephritidae , the gall flies. It is found in the  Palearctic . The larvae feed on  Cirsium heterophyllum and Cirsium oleraceum.

Distribution
United Kingdom & Scandinavia, North to Italy, Bulgaria & Caucasus.

References

Tephritinae
Insects described in 1844
Diptera of Europe